Theodorus Marinus Roest van Limburg (8 July 1806, Rotterdam – 3 March 1887, Florence) was a Dutch journalist, diplomat, and politician.

Early life
Theodorus Marinus was the son of Jacob Adriaan Roest van Limburg, merchant in wine at Rotterdam and Antwerpen, and Sara Cornelia Rochussen. He studied law in Liège, Ghent and Leiden (1827-1831).

Career
He worked at the Departments of Colonies and Foreign Affairs. From 1837 till 1841 he served as editor of the liberal newspaper Arnhemsche Courant. His diplomatic career started in 1842, when he was named secretary of the Dutch Legation in Vienna. From 1851-1856 he served as Chargé d’affaires in Lisbon and he became Envoy in Washington, serving from 1856 until 1868.

Roest van Limburg became Minister of Foreign Affairs in 1868. His tenure as Foreign Minister was marked by the Franco-German War from 1870 to 1871 in the liberal cabinet of Prime Minister Pieter Philip van Bosse.  There was little confidence in him in the House of Representatives which led to his resignation, which was honorably granted.  After his resignation he lived abroad.

Personal life
On 23 August 1858, Roest van Limburg was married to the American Isabella "Belle" Cass (1805-1879) in Stonington, Michigan. Isabella was the daughter of Elizabeth (née Spencer) Cass and Lewis Cass, who served as governor of the Michigan Territory, U.S. Secretary of War, U.S. Secretary of State, U.S. Ambassador to France, and a U.S. Senator.

He died on 3 March 1887 in Florence.

References

External links
 

1806 births
1887 deaths
19th-century Dutch diplomats
Ministers of Foreign Affairs of the Netherlands
Independent politicians in the Netherlands
Writers from Rotterdam
University of Liège alumni
Ghent University alumni
Leiden University alumni
19th-century Dutch journalists
Male journalists
19th-century male writers
Diplomats from Rotterdam
Politicians from Rotterdam